Palinure may refer to:

Palinure, a 1992 book of poetry by Arnaldo Calveyra
Palinure-class brig of the French navy
French brig Palinure (1804)

See also
Palinurus (disambiguation)